The 1992 United States House of Representatives election in Vermont was held on Tuesday, November 3, 1992 to elect the U.S. representative from the state's at-large congressional district. The election coincided with the elections of other federal and state offices, including a quadrennial presidential election and an election to the U.S. Senate.

Republican primary

Candidates
Tim Philbin, insurance agent
Ralph Sinclair, snack company owner (Withdrew, endorsed Philbin)
Jeff Wennberg, mayor of Rutland

Campaign
A total of three candidates made the ballot in the Republican primary, insurance agent Tim Philbin, Rutland mayor Jeff Wennberg, and Ralph Sinclair. Wennberg was considered a moderate Republican, backing abortion rights and tax increases on the rich, while Philbin and Sinclair were conservative Republicans who were opposed to abortion and any tax increases. Originally, Wennberg was considered the frontrunner in the primary, but in early September 1992 Sinclair, who had fallen into a distinct third place in the race, withdrew his candidacy and backed Philbin, which was viewed as potentially giving the latter the edge.

Endorsements

Results

Democratic primary

Candidates

Declared
Lewis E. Young, chef and candidate for Vermont Secretary of State in 1988

Declined
David Wolk, state senator

Results

Liberty Union primary

General election

Candidates
John Dewey (Natural Law), former director of Flight Training at the Florida Institute of Technology
Peter Diamondstone (Liberty Union), perennial candidate and socialist activist
Douglas M. Miller (Freedom for LaRouche)
Tim Philbin (Republican), insurance agent
Bernie Sanders (Independent), incumbent U.S. Representative
Lewis E. Young (Democratic), chef and candidate for Vermont Secretary of State in 1988

Campaign
As the campaign began Sanders and Philbin immediately began to attack each other in the press, with their sniping deemed by the Brattleboro Reformer as a "fax war". Sanders attacked Philbin for opposing abortions, even in cases of rape and incest, and championed his own record supporting abortion rights. Philbin responded by accusing Sanders of misrepresenting his position, and accused the incumbent of supporting "fat budgets and high taxes".

Debates

Endorsements

Polling

Results

Notes

References

1992
Vermont
1992 Vermont elections
Bernie Sanders